The Qube, previously known as the Chase Tower, the Bank One Center, and the National Bank of Detroit Building, is a high-rise office building and Quicken Loans operations center in the U.S. designated Detroit Financial District at 611 Woodward Avenue, in Downtown Detroit, Michigan. It was built in 1959 and stands at 14 floors in height. It was completely remodeled in 2011 and is currently in the process of remodeling again. It was designed in the modern architectural style, and uses a great deal of marble to coordinate with the buildings in the nearby Civic Center. It was designed by Albert Kahn Associates.

History
The Qube stands on the site of Detroit's first skyscraper, the Hammond Building. The ground floor of this building is a massive 1.5-story glass sheathed, banking hall. The building was known as 'Chase Tower' from 2006 to 2011 to reflect Chase Bank's buyout of Bank One. In March 2007, the Sterling Group purchased the tower from JP Morgan Chase. Occupancy was approximately 50 percent at the time of sale. The building has had 3 official names now, for each of the 3 successive banks that have owned it: National Bank of Detroit (NBD), succeeded by Bank One, and lastly Chase.
The building has gone by several names in the past, most notably: Bank One Center, National Bank of Detroit Building, Bank One Building and Chase Tower.

In April 2011, Quicken Loans bought the building, renamed it the Qube and relocated 4,000 of the company's employees to the facility. The company plans to fill remaining space with retail.

In August 2014, the Detroit bureau of Southfield-based ABC affiliate WXYZ-TV moved into the Qube after spending several decades across from the headquarters of the Detroit Police Department; its new location now includes satellite studio and newsroom facilities.

Location
The building is located on the block bordered by Woodward Avenue to the east, with the First National Building across Woodward. West Fort Street borders the building on the north, with Cadillac Square and 1001 Woodward across the street. Griswold Street borders the building to the west, with the Penobscot Block and Chrysler House across the street. West Congress Street borders the building to the south, with the Guardian Building across the street. Across Woodward Ave. from the Guardian Building lies Ally Detroit Center, and the Buhl Building lies across Griswold Street, to the west. The building has a similar shape and size to the 411 Building, owned by competitor Comerica.

References

Further reading

External links
 Qube under construction c. 1959
Google Maps location of the Qube

National Bank Detroit historic postcard

Skyscraper office buildings in Detroit
Downtown Detroit
JPMorgan Chase buildings
Office buildings completed in 1959
National Register of Historic Places in Wayne County, Michigan
Historic district contributing properties in Michigan
1959 establishments in Michigan
Rock Ventures
1950s architecture in the United States
Modernist architecture in Michigan
Albert Kahn (architect) buildings